Shana Tesh born Milady in 1987 is Belgian television personality and singer of Chilean and Spanish origin.

In 2003, she took part in the French television series À la Recherche de la Nouvelle Star based on the popular British show Pop Idol. She appeared in that contest under her real name Milady.

In 2004, she released a remake of the Spanish hit "Porque te vas" and in 2006, released "Boum Boum Boum", a song in Spanish language which was a chart success in France, in addition to appearing in Belgian French charts and in Switzerland. She followed it with an album of Latin sounds titled Musica.

Discography

Albums
2006: Musica

Singles

*Did not appear in the official Belgian Ultratop 50 charts, but rather in the bubbling under Ultratip charts.

References

1987 births
Living people
21st-century Belgian women singers
21st-century Belgian singers
Belgian television personalities
French-language singers of Belgium